KeuPa HT are a semi-professional ice hockey team based in  Keuruu, Finland. They are members of the second highest league in Finland, Mestis. The club was founded in 1995 in the Finnish fourth division II-Divisioona after the ice hockey club decided to part company with the Keuruu sports club. They play their home games in the Keuruu Ice Hall, which holds 1200 spectators. KeuPa are two time Suomi-sarja champions and one time Mestis champions.

History

KeuPa HT was born in 1995 after the ice hockey branch of the Keuruu sports club split from the football and ice skating branches. KeuPa kept their traditional name but added "Hockey Team" to the end to differentiate themselves; hence, the abbreviation HT appears at the end of the name.

The club was promoted to the third division, Suomi-sarja, in 2011–2012 and went on to claim the gold medal and win the third-division championship. By winning, they entered the playoffs with LeKi, KooVee and HCK that year for the right to be promoted to the second division, Mestis. KeuPa finished third in the playoffs and remained in Suomi-sarja, while the other two clubs were promoted to Mestis. HCK, who came second in the playoffs, were promoted only because Wafer-Laser went bankrupt and had to pull out of Mestis.

In the 2012–2013 season, the club sought to defend their title but could manage only a third-place finish at the conclusion of the season, winning the bronze medal. RoKi won the championship title and qualified for Mestis. KeuPa HT had to settle for another season in the third division after coming close to promotion again. The head coach quit at the end of the season.

The 2013–2014 season started off badly for the club. They had not been able to find a replacement for their head coach, and the club was in a precarious financial situation, staring at bankruptcy or folding the club up and ceasing operations, which would mean that they would not be able to compete in the Suomi-sarja season. The KeuPa HT players started a fundraising campaign to raise the money needed to keep the club afloat and allow them to compete in the league that year. By season's start, they had managed to raise the needed money, and they began the season on schedule. The club went through a rocky, patchy start to the season but managed to gain momentum at the end of the regular season and just reach the playoff finals. In the playoffs, KeuPa dispatched with RoKi and Bewe Tuuskin to meet FPS (formerly FoPS) of Forssa in the final. KeuPa HT beat FPS in the final and qualified for Mestis for the first time, ending what became a Cinderella season from a very bleak start.

KeuPa HT went through two head coaches in their first season in the second division in 2014–2015, firstly Jussi Tupamäki then Kari Rautakorpi from 23 February 2015. The team finished the regular season in 8th position, just missing out on the relegation positions of 9 and 10. Their record for the season was 13 wins and 30 losses with 8 overtime victories and 5 overtime losses for a total of 60 points from 56 matches.

Season-by-season-results

Source:

Honours

Championships
Mestis 
 Champions (1): 2017–18
 Runners-Up (1): 2018–19
Suomi-sarja 
 Champions (2): 2011–12, 2013–14

Players

Current roster

Team roster for the 2021–22 Mestis season

Well-known former players
A list of players that have played for KeuPa HT and gone onto play at the top professional level of hockey in Finland or abroad.

References:

Team staff
Current as of 2021–22 Mestis season

Leaders

Team captains
All team captains of the club since 2005-06:

Head coaches
All head coaches of the club since 2007-08:

References

External links
 KeuPa HT Home
 Mestis League Home
 Translated KeuPa HT News

Mestis teams
Ice hockey clubs established in 1995
Ice hockey teams in Finland
1995 establishments in Finland
Keuruu